Faxonius propinquus, the Northern clearwater crayfish, is a species of crayfish in the family Cambaridae found in Ontario, Quebec and the Northeastern and Midwestern United States.

References

External links

Cambaridae
Freshwater crustaceans of North America
Crustaceans described in 1852
Taxobox binomials not recognized by IUCN